The buildings at 375–379 Flatbush Avenue and 185–187 Sterling Place are a historic group of four commercial and residential buildings located in the Prospect Heights neighborhood of Brooklyn, New York City. They were built in 1885 and are in the Neo-Grec style with Second Empire elements. The 377–379 Flatbush Avenue building is a 3.5-story masonry structure with a commercial ground floor, apartments above, and a distinctive corner tower with pyramidal roof.  It features a mansard roof.  The 375 Flatbush Avenue building is a commercial/residential structure identical in form to 377–379 Flatbush Avenue, but without a mansard roof.  The 185–187 Sterling Place buildings are two single family row houses built as companions to the other buildings.

The buildings were listed on the National Register of Historic Places in 1984, and are located within the Prospect Heights Historic District created by the New York City Landmarks Preservation Commission in 2009.

References
Notes

External links

Commercial buildings on the National Register of Historic Places in New York City
Residential buildings on the National Register of Historic Places in New York City
Residential buildings in Brooklyn
Commercial buildings in Brooklyn
Italianate architecture in New York City
Commercial buildings completed in 1885
Residential buildings completed in 1885
Prospect Heights, Brooklyn
National Register of Historic Places in Brooklyn